The Bissekty Formation (sometimes referred to as Bissekt) is a geologic formation and Lagerstätte which crops out in the Kyzyl Kum desert of Uzbekistan, and dates to the Late Cretaceous Period. Laid down in the mid to late Turonian, it is dated to about 92 to 90 Ma (million years ago).

Description 
The lithology of the sediment largely consists of cross bedded sandstones with interbeds of massive sandstone, well cemented intraformational conglomerate, siltstones and mudstones. Most of the fossils are found as clasts within the conglomerates.

Fossil content 
The Bissekty Formation is characterised by a mix of marine, brackish, freshwater, and terrestrial animal fossils. This stands in contrast the strictly marine fossils found in the underlying Dzheirantui Formation, and indicates that the Bissekty was formed during the regression of a saltwater sea. The coastline expanded inland again in the upper portion of the Bissekty, represented by a proportional increase of fully aquatic species, which were almost completely absent from the middle period of the formation. Semi-aquatic species remained abundant during this middle period, and the geology of the formations indicates that a braided river system took the place of the coastline. Eventually the area was again completely underwater, during the time period represented by the later Aitym Formation, which preserves coastal marine sediments.

Vertebrates 
The Bissekty Formation is notable for preserving the most abundant Turonian land animal fossils in Eurasia, and the most diverse fauna of Late Cretaceous eutherians (placental mammals and relatives) in the world.

Listings and accompanying information are based on a survey of the Bissekty Formation published by Cory Redman and Lindsey Leighton in 2009 unless otherwise noted. Aquatic and semi-aquatic species are restricted to freshwater unless otherwise noted.

Amphibians 
An indeterminate species of salamander-like albanerpetontid amphibian. An indeterminate gobiatid species.

Cartilaginous fish

Crocodylomorphs

Lizards 
An indeterminate gekkonid. An indeterminate priscagamid. An indeterminate scincid.

Mammals and other therapsids

Plesiosaurs

Pterosaurs

Ray-finned fish 
An indeterminate acipenserid. An indeterminate albulid (bonefish) species. An indeterminate albulid (bonefish) species. An indeterminate pholidophoriform species.

Dinosaurs

Theropods 
An unnamed ornithomimosaur, known from fragmentary remains. An indeterminate tyrannosaurid species, known from isolated teeth.

Sauropods

Ornithischians

Enantiornithines

Turtles 
An indeterminate trionychid (soft-shell) turtle species that was tolerant of brackish water.

Invertebrates 
An indeterminate species of marine coral.

Arthropods

Molluscs 
An indeterminate species of marine placenticeratid ammonite. An indeterminate species of marine teredinid shipworm. An indeterminate marine trigoniid bivalve. An indeterminate marine veneroid bivalve.

References

Bibliography

Further reading 
 
 
 
 
 
 

 
Geologic formations of Uzbekistan
Upper Cretaceous Series of Asia
Sandstone formations
Conglomerate formations
Mudstone formations
Fluvial deposits
Fossiliferous stratigraphic units of Asia
Paleontology in Uzbekistan
Formations
Formations